Replicate may refer to:

 Replicate (biology), the exact copy resulting from self-replication of genetic material, a cell, or an organism
 Replicate (statistics), a fully repeated experiment or set of test conditions.

See also
 Replication (disambiguation)